Cha Jung-won (born Cha Mi-young on ) is a South Korean actress and model. She landed her lead role in Wednesday 3:30 PM (2017) and  Lawless Lawyer (2018).

Career

2012: Debut
Cha Jung-won made her acting debut in the film titled Horror Stories in 2012.

She landed her second role in the web drama, Loss:Time:Love and made a cameo appearance in All About My Mom. Her first supporting role came soon after, playing as Jung Seon-min in She Was Pretty in 2015.

2016-present: Breakthrough with lead roles
Jung-won landed her first lead role in the SBS drama, Kidnapping Assemblyman Mr. Clean in 2016, and Wednesday 3:30 PM in 2017. She had a cameo in While You Were Sleeping. She also played the lead role in Oh! Dear Half-Basement Goddesses, and supporting roles in Lawless Lawyer and My Absolute Boyfriend both in 2018.

On November 8, 2022, Cha signed an exclusive contract with Saram Entertainment.

Filmography

Film

Television series

Other notes
She has a white Bichon Frise, and the dog's name is Rosie.
She is famous for her fashion and beauty sense. She spent three seasons on the fashion and beauty program MC.

References

External links

South Korean film actresses
South Korean television actresses
People from Busan
1989 births
Living people
21st-century South Korean actresses